Baek Seung-do (born 16 June 1968) is a South Korean long-distance runner. He competed in the men's marathon at the 2000 Summer Olympics.

References

1968 births
Living people
Athletes (track and field) at the 2000 Summer Olympics
South Korean male long-distance runners
South Korean male marathon runners
Olympic athletes of South Korea
Place of birth missing (living people)
Asian Games medalists in athletics (track and field)
Asian Games bronze medalists for South Korea
Athletes (track and field) at the 1998 Asian Games
Medalists at the 1998 Asian Games
20th-century South Korean people
21st-century South Korean people